is a stable of sumo wrestlers, part of the Dewanoumi ichimon or group of stables. As of January 2023 it had 17 wrestlers. It has been led by former sekiwake Tochinowaka Kiyotaka since 2003. It was one of the most successful stables in 2013, with six sekitori wrestlers, including the Georgian Tochinoshin and the now retired Japanese born (but Korean national) Tochinowaka Michihiro, who used the current head coach's old ring name.

It was founded in the mid 18th century by a wrestler named Kasugano Gunpachi. It became inactive for a long time but was led in the Meiji period by a referee named Kimura Soshiro (this is no longer allowed as oyakata must now be former wrestlers). He adopted as his son the 27th yokozuna Tochigiyama, who led the stable for over thirty years. He in turn adopted as his son the 44th yokozuna Tochinishiki, who became the head in 1959 whilst still an active wrestler and later served as the chairman of the Japan Sumo Association. Tochinoumi took over upon Tochinishiki's death in 1990 and led the stable until his retirement in 2003. The stable absorbed Mihogaseki stable in 2013 when its stablemaster (former ōzeki Masuiyama Daishirō II) reached the mandatory retirement age.

Kasugano-oyakata was warned by the Sumo Association in 2011 after he beat three of his charges with a golf club for breaking a curfew. In a separate case, a junior wrestler was convicted in 2014 of an assault on another wrestler and given a three year jail sentence, suspended for four years. In March 2017 the victim sued Kasugano-oyakata and the now retired assailant, saying he was still suffering from the effects of the broken jaw he received and that Kasugano failed to exercise appropriate oversight.

Ring name conventions
Many wrestlers at this stable take ring names or shikona that begin with the character 栃 (read: tochi), in deference to the long line of owners who have used this character in their shikona. It originally referred to Tochigi Prefecture, where Tochigiyama came from, but subsequent owners were not from there and the prefix no longer has a geographical meaning.

Owners
2003–present: 11th Kasugano Kiyotaka (riji, former sekiwake Tochinowaka)
1990-2003: 10th Kasugano Terumasa (the 49th yokozuna Tochinoumi) 
1959-1990: 9th Kasugano Kiyotaka (the 44th yokozuna Tochinishiki)
1925-1959: 8th Kasugano Takeya (the 27th yokozuna Tochigiyama)

Notable active wrestlers

Tochinoshin (best rank ōzeki)
Aoiyama (best rank sekiwake)
 (best rank jūryō)
 (best rank jūryō)

Coaches
Fujigane Masaharu (iin, former komusubi Daizen)
Hatachiyama Hitoshi (iin, former komusubi Tochinohana)
Mihogaseki Atsushi (iin, former maegashira Tochisakae)
Takenawa Taiichi (iin, former sekiwake Tochinonada)
Iwatomo Mamoru (shunin, former maegashira Kimurayama)
Kiyomigata Yuichiro (shunin, former sekiwake Tochiōzan)

Notable former members
Tochinishiki  (the 44th yokozuna)
Tochinoumi (|the 49th yokozuna)
Tochihikari (former ōzeki)
Kaneshiro (former sekiwake)
Masudayama (former sekiwake)
Tochiakagi (former sekiwake)
Tochiazuma (former sekiwake)
Tochiōzan (former sekiwake)
Tochitsukasa (former sekiwake)
Tochinowaka Michihiro (former maegashira)
Kasuganishiki (former maegashira)

Assistants
Torafusuyama (sewanin, former makushita, real name Tomoyuki Tamaru)
Tochigenō (sewanin, former makushita, real name Yasuyuki Shigeto)
Tochinofuji (wakaimonogashira, former maegashira, real name Tatsuyuki Kusano)

Referees
Kimura Shōtarō (sanyaku gyōji, real name Yoshimitsu Morita)
Kimura Akijiro (makuuchi gyōji, real name Shigehiro Nakazawa)
Kimura Zennosuke (juryo gyoji, real name Makoto Kimura)

Ushers
Jirō (san'yaku yobidashi, real name Kazuo Nishide)

Hairdressers
Tokotakumi (fifth class tokoyama)

Location and access
Tokyo, Sumida Ward, Ryōgoku 1-7-11
7 minute walk from Ryōgoku Station on the Sōbu Line

See also
List of sumo stables
List of active sumo wrestlers
List of past sumo wrestlers
Glossary of sumo terms

References

External links
Facebook site 
Japan Sumo Association profile
Article on Kasugano stable

Active sumo stables